The Reunion is a 2011 American action film directed by Michael Pavone and starring John Cena, Ethan Embry, Michael Rispoli, Boyd Holbrook, and Amy Smart. The film was released on October 21, 2011. It received negative reviews.

Plot
After the death of her father, Nina (Smart) is charged with fulfilling his last wish – bring her three brothers back together… Sam (Cena), a hardened cop currently on suspension; Leo (Embry), a loud-mouthed overbearing bail bondsman; and Douglas (Holbrook), a handsome 20-year-old thief fresh out of jail . When Leo discovers the con he pledged a lot of money for is suspected of kidnapping one of the wealthiest men in the country, he convinces his two brothers to join him on what will become a dangerous, yet exhilarating adventure.

Cast
 John Cena as Sam Cleary
 Ethan Embry as Leo Cleary
 Boyd Holbrook as Douglas Cleary
 Amy Smart as Nina Cleary
 Michael Rispoli as Marcus Canton
 Gregg Henry as Kyle Wills
 Lela Loren as Theresa Trujillo
 Jack Conley as Jack Nealon
 Carmen Serano as Angelina the stripper

Production
WWE Studios produced the film alongside Samuel Goldwyn Films. Filming took place in Albuquerque, New Mexico in October 2010.

Home media
The film was released on Blu-ray and DVD on November 8, 2011.

Reception
The film received  negative reviews. Rotten Tomatoes gives the film a score of 8% based on 12 reviews, and average rating of 3.3/10.

References

External links
 
 
 
 

2011 films
2011 action films
WWE Studios films
American action films
2010s English-language films
2010s American films